Julian Bradley (born 16 July 1992) is an Irish tennis player.

Bradley has a career high ATP singles ranking of 869 achieved on 2 March 2020. He also has a career high ATP doubles ranking of 319 achieved on 7 October 2019.

Bradley represents Ireland at the Davis Cup, where he has a W/L record of 4–1.

Bradley played college tennis at the University of North Florida.

Future and Challenger finals

Doubles 16 (8–8)

References

External links

1992 births
Living people
Irish male tennis players
Tennis players from Dublin (city)
Tennis players from Atlanta
North Florida Ospreys men's tennis players